T31 may refer to:
 Type 31 frigate, a planned class of frigates for the United Kingdom's Royal Navy.
 ,  a German warship of World War II
 General Electric T31, an American turboprop engine
 the T31 cannon, an American aircraft weapon; see Hispano-Suiza HS.404
 Aero Country Airport, an airport in McKinney, Texas with an FAA location identifier of T31